Miss America's Outstanding Teen 2019 was the 13th Miss America's Outstanding Teen pageant held at the Linda Chapin Theater in the Orange County Convention Center in Orlando, Florida on July 28, 2018. Jessica Baeder of Alabama crowned her successor London Hibbs of Texas at the end of the event.

Judges 
The panel of judges for the 2019 competition included:
 Lacey Russ Randall, Miss America's Outstanding Teen 2011
 Ivan Pulinkala, Dean of the College of the Arts at Kennesaw State University
 Patrick Bowen, Director of World Jazz Studies at the Las Vegas Academy of the Arts
 Emily Luther, singer and Miss Rhode Island's Outstanding Teen 2009
 Shaunna Payne Gold, Associate Director of Student Development at the University of Maryland
 Brian Dameris, Chief of Staff at the Charity Network

Results summary

Placements

§ America's Choice

Order of announcements

Top 12

Top 9

Top 7

Awards

Preliminary awards

Talent awards

Other awards

Contestants 
The Miss America's Outstanding Teen 2019 contestants are:

References

2019
2018 beauty pageants
2018 in Florida